Cupidesthes leonina, the leonine ciliate blue, is a butterfly in the family Lycaenidae. It is found in Sierra Leone, Ivory Coast, Ghana, Togo, Nigeria (the Cross River loop), Cameroon, Gabon, the Republic of the Congo, the Democratic Republic of the Congo (Sankuru and Lualaba), Uganda and Tanzania. The habitat consists of wet forests.

Adults of both sexes have been found on the flowers of Eupatorium species.

References

Butterflies described in 1903
Lycaenesthini
Butterflies of Africa
Taxa named by George Thomas Bethune-Baker